Louis Allen "Hap" Farber Jr. (born July 1, 1948) is a former American football linebacker who played one season in the National Football League (NFL) with the Minnesota Vikings and New Orleans Saints. He was drafted by the Vikings in the seventh round of the 1970 NFL Draft. He played college football at the University of Mississippi and attended Murrah High School in Jackson, Mississippi.

References

External links
Just Sports Stats
College stats

Living people
1948 births
Players of American football from Norfolk, Virginia
American football linebackers
Ole Miss Rebels football players
Minnesota Vikings players
New Orleans Saints players